Bahmai-ye Garmsiri-ye Jonubi Rural District is a rural district (dehestan) in the Central District of Bahmai County, Kohgiluyeh and Boyer-Ahmad Province, Iran. At the 2006 census, its population was 8,288, in 1,550 families. The rural district has 49 villages.

References 

Rural Districts of Kohgiluyeh and Boyer-Ahmad Province
Bahmai County